This list is of the Natural Monuments of Japan within the Prefecture of Nagasaki.

National Natural Monuments
As of 1 April 2021, thirty-five Natural Monuments have been designated.

Prefectural Natural Monuments
As of 26 February 2021, one hundred and five Natural Monuments have been designated at a prefectural level.

Municipal Natural Monuments
As of 1 May 2020, one hundred and thirty-eight Natural Monuments have been designated at a municipal level.

See also
 Cultural Properties of Japan
 Parks and gardens in Nagasaki Prefecture
 List of Places of Scenic Beauty of Japan (Nagasaki)
 List of Historic Sites of Japan (Nagasaki)

References

External links
  Cultural Properties in Nagasaki Prefecture

 Nagasaki
Nagasaki Prefecture